Tsararano is a village in the commune of Dembéni on Mayotte.

Populated places in Mayotte